Mala'e is a village in the chiefdom of Alo, on the French Pacific island of Futuna, which is part of the Wallis and Futuna group. It is located in the centre of the island's south coast.
Its population, according to the 2018 census, is 168 people.

References

Populated places in Wallis and Futuna